Disney's Beauty and the Beast: A Board Game Adventure is a Disney Beauty and the Beast boardgame adventure for the Game Boy Color. IGN gave the game a rating of 6.0 out of 10.

References

1999 video games
Beauty and the Beast (franchise) video games
Game Boy Color games
Game Boy Color-only games
Left Field Productions games
Multiplayer and single-player video games
Video games based on adaptations
Video games based on films
Video games developed in the United States
Video games set in France